is the debut single of Japanese R&B singer Misia, released on February 21, 1998. It sold 3,030 (8 cm) and 2,350 (12 cm) copies in its first week but became a long seller and after 16 weeks, it peaked at #11 and #20 respectively.

Because the Oricon charts only started adding up the total for both versions of a single in May 2001, "Tsutsumikomu Yō ni..." could not reach the Top 10. Had both versions been counted as one, the single would have peaked at #8 on its tenth week, as well as remaining in the Top 10 for seven non-consecutive weeks. "Tsutsumikomu Yō ni..." is the only single for which Misia did not contribute lyrics to.

The song was used in an Elleseine cosmetics commercial.

Makidai, now a member of Exile, was one of the backup dancers featured in the music video of "Tsutsumikomu Yō ni...".

Track list

Charts

Oricon Sales Chart (8cm)

Oricon Sales Chart (12cm)

Cover versions
In 2000, S.E.S. released a Korean remake titled "감싸안으며 (Show Me Your Love)" featured on their album A Letter from Greenland.
In 2009, W.C.D.A. recorded a house music version of the song.
In 2022, iScream released a cover of the song as their 3rd digital single.

External links
Misia official website

1998 debut singles
Misia songs
1998 songs